The Chandelas of Kalinjar were a royal dynasty who controlled some parts of former Chandela territory. They were a minor branch of the Chandelas of Jejakabhukti.

History

Establishment
The Hindu princes and chiefs were discontented at their loss of independence and had recovered Kannauj, Benares, Gwalior, and Kalinjar had been lost during Qutb al-Din Aibak's reign. One of these princes, who recovered Kalinjar and perhaps Gwalior, probably a descendant of the main Chandelas of Jejakabhukti founded this dynasty.

Conflict with Afghans
One of its rulers was killed by Sher Shah Suri's army after he defeated the ruler in 1545 CE. This ruler's contemporary was Keerat Rai of Mahoba, another ruler descended from the Chandelas, and the father of Rani Durgavati. The powerful Gond kingdom of Garha Katanga lay to its south.

References

Bibliography
 
 
 

Chandelas of Jejakabhukti